Lambert Park is a purpose-built soccer stadium in Leichhardt, New South Wales, Australia.  It is the home ground of the APIA Leichhardt, and the Sydney FC Youth who participate in the National Youth League.

The stadium is peculiar in that it runs east to west, rather than north to south. The stadium has a nominal capacity of 7000, with 2000 seated in two main stands on either side of the playing field. In the southern of these stands there are dressing room facilities, a social club with views of the game, press facilities and media facilities. The northern stand runs the full length of the playing field, seating around 1200 spectators in 8 rows. This stand is regularly full for New South Wales Premier League encounters, with attendances at the ground in the last few seasons ranging from 800 to 3000 spectators. The western and eastern ends behind the goals are hilled, bringing the ground capacity to around 6000 spectators.

In March, 2011 as part of the campaign from the NSW Liberal Party ahead of the 2011 New South Wales state election leader Barry O'Farrell promised $2.2 million would be spent upgrading Lambert Park. This would include a new Synthetic playing field, installation of a new perimeter fence, a new club house including bigger dressing rooms for players and officials.

Gallery

References

External links
 Austradiums profile

Soccer venues in Sydney
Rugby union stadiums in Australia
Sports venues in Sydney
APIA Leichhardt FC
Sports venues completed in 1954
1954 establishments in Australia
A-League Women stadiums
Sydney FC (A-League Women)